Iain Stewart may refer to:

 Iain Stewart, drummer and member of Scottish indie rock band The Phantom Band
 Iain Stewart, president of the Public Health Agency of Canada
 Iain Stewart (footballer) (born 1969), Scottish football player and manager
 Iain Stewart (geologist) (born 1964), Scottish geologist
 Iain Stewart (physicist), Canadian-American theoretical nuclear and particle physicist
 Iain Stewart (politician) (born 1972), British Conservative Member of Parliament for Milton Keynes South
 Iain Maxwell Stewart (1916–1985), Scottish industrialist

See also 
 Ian Stewart (disambiguation)